Sandvikens IF is a Swedish football club located in Sandviken. The club, formed 6 June 1918, has played 21 seasons in the highest Swedish league, but is in the third highest Swedish league, Division 1. Sandvikens IF are affiliated to the Gestriklands Fotbollförbund.

As Sandviken is an industrial community, dominated by the steel and metal corporation Sandvik, the team has been much influenced by this. The name of the home ground, Jernvallen, would translate approximately as The Iron Ground, while the nicknames Järngänget and Stålmännen are self-explaining. Stålmännen has a double meaning, as it also is the plural form of Stålmannen, the Swedish name for Superman.

Season to season

Current squad

Achievements

 Allsvenskan:
 Best placement (3rd): 1935–36 – and gained thereby the Little Silver medals.

External links
 Sandvikens IF – official site

Footnotes

 
Allsvenskan clubs
Football clubs in Gävleborg County
Association football clubs established in 1918
1918 establishments in Sweden